Keeping Up with the Kardashians is an American reality television series that airs on the E! cable network. The show focuses on the personal and professional lives of the Kardashian–Jenner blended family. Its premise originated with Ryan Seacrest, who also serves as an executive producer. The series debuted on October 14, 2007 and has subsequently become one of the longest-running reality television series in the country. The eighteenth season premiered on March 26, 2020.

Cast

Main cast 
 Kim Kardashian 
 Kourtney Kardashian 
 Khloé Kardashian 
 Kendall Jenner 
 Kylie Jenner 
 Kris Jenner 
 Scott Disick 
 Kanye West

Recurring cast 
 MJ Shannon
 Corey Gamble
 Larsa Pippen
 Jonathan Cheban
 Malika Haqq
 Mason Disick
 North West

Development and production
On February 25, 2020, it was announced that the season will premiere in March and that for the first time in the history of the series, the screening will be on Thursdays rather than Sundays as has been the case so far.

Due to the 2020 coronavirus pandemic in the United States, the last episode of the season was filmed using mobile phone cameras.

Episodes

Ratings

References 

Keeping Up with the Kardashians
Television shows related to the Kardashian–Jenner family
2020 American television seasons